Irreligion in Sri Lanka may refer to atheism, agnosticism, deism, religious skepticism, secular humanism or general secularist attitudes in Sri Lanka. The Sri Lankan national census does not provide an option for no religion.

This is supported by a 2008 Gallup poll which found 99% of Sri Lankans considered religion an important aspect of their daily lives. Only Niger, Bangladesh and Indonesia scored higher than this.

Sri Lankan atheists and agnostics
Arthur C Clarke - science fiction author.
Indika Rathnayake

See also
 Religion in Sri Lanka
 Freedom of religion in Sri Lanka
 Christianity in Sri Lanka
 Islam in Sri Lanka
 Demographics of Sri Lanka
 Demographics of atheism

References

 
Religious demographics